Night of the Ding-Dong is a 1954 stage play by Ralph Peterson. It was this second play, following The Square Ring. It is a comedy set in Adelaide just after the Crimean War about the locals fearing a Russian invasion. It is based on a real incident.

Plot
In 19th century Adelaide, after the Crimean War, Colonial Administrator Colonel Beauchamp trains a volunteer defence corps at the weekends, and worries about a Russian invasion. Idealistic schoolteacher Higsen, who is in love with Beauchamp's daughter, is more concerned with free education. Higsen asks Beauchamp to marry the latter's daughter but is turned down because education must give way to defence.

When a Russian gunboat is rumoured to be near Adelaide, Beauchamp sets about whipping up the public into a frenzy in order to fund a standing army.

Background
Peterson said he was told the story about a rumoured Russian invasion by his grandmother when he was a child. He came across the story years later when researching another project and decided to write it. "It was amazing how Adelaide was completely swept away by the invasion scare," said Peterson. "Why, I don't know. Even Sydney folk were worried. This led to fortifications being built at Fort Denison, South Head and other places, while in Adelaide, Fort Glandore, Fort Glenelg, and later Fort Largs were built."

1958 British TV adaptation

The play was adapted for British TV in 1958 as part of Armchair Theatre.

Cast
David Courtney as Marcus Higson
Hilton Edwards as Colonel Beauchamp
John Kidd as Morgan Nash
Andree Melly as Louise Beauchamp
Charles Morgan as Godwin Shedly
Peter Myers as Thaddeus Beauchamp
Athene Seyler as Mrs. Beauchamp senior
Ewen Solon as Harry Kelp
Joyce Worsley as Victoria Beauchamp

Reception
Variety said "What started out as an apparently serious and thought-provoking aplay quickly developed into rather pointless farce."

1961 Australian TV adaptation

The play was filmed for Australian TV. It originally aired 3 May 1961 on ABC's Melbourne station, and was recorded for showing on other ABC stations. The original broadcast was live.

Filmink magazine said the concept sounded "like the 1966 film The Russians Are Coming! The Russians Are Coming!."

Premise
In the 1870s the city of Adelaide fears a Russian invasion. Teacher Marcus Higson wishes to marry Victoria Beauchamp but her father, Colonel Beauchamp, refuses to give permission. Higson wants the government to introduce compulsory education but Colonel Beauchamp wants to spend money on defence.

A Russian ship is spotted off the coast of South Australia, prompting fear of invasion. Higson joins the militia led by Colonel Beauchamp.

Cast

Michael Duffield as Col Beauchamp
Madeline Howell as Victoria Beauchamp
David Mitchell as Marcus Higson
Anne Charleston as Louise
Campbell Copelin  as Mr Kelp
Keith Hudson as Mr Smedly
Charles Sinclair as Mr Nash
Carole Potter as Abigail
Roland Redshaw as Captain Manley
Stewart Weller as Jeffries
Eric Conway as gardener
Nevil Thurgood as gardener

Production

The show was broadcast live from the ABC's studios in Melbourne. It was the TV debut for Ann Charleston.

The play was also adapted for radio on the ABC in 1961.

Reception
The critic from the Sydney Morning Herald thought that "uniform competence in acting could not-altogether suggest the whimsy inherent in" the play, adding that "William Sterling's production was directed primarily at extracting every ounce of farce."

See also
List of television plays broadcast on Australian Broadcasting Corporation (1960s)

References

External links

Night of the Ding Dong at National Film and Sound Archive

1961 television plays
Australian television plays
Australian Broadcasting Corporation original programming
English-language television shows
Black-and-white Australian television shows
Live television shows
1959 plays
1958 in British television
1961 in Australian television